Diaw is a surname.  Notable people with the name include:
 Aminata Diaw (1959–2017), Senegalese academic and political philosopher
 Boris Diaw (born 1982), French professional basketball player
 Doudou Diaw (born 1975), Senegalese footballer who plays defender
 Mouhamadou Diaw (born 1981), Senegalese footballer who plays midfielder

Surnames of African origin